The British Rail Class 221 Super Voyager is a class of tilting diesel-electric multiple unit express passenger trains built in Bruges, Belgium, by Bombardier Transportation in 2001/02.

The Class 221 are similar to the Class 220 Voyager units, but were built with a tilting mechanism enabling up to six degrees of tilt to allow higher speeds on curved tracks, most have five coaches, and they have a different bogie design.

The trains are divided between two operators, Avanti West Coast (20 sets) and CrossCountry (24 sets). CrossCountry sets had their tilt function disabled in 2008 to improve reliability and reduce maintenance costs.

Details

The Class 221s were produced as five- or four-coach sets. Each coach is equipped with a Cummins QSK19 diesel engine producing  at 1,800rpm, driving an electrical generator which powers two motors, each driving one (inner) axle per bogie via a cardan shaft and final drive.  can be travelled between refuellings.
The coach bodies, the engines and most of the equipment of the Class 221s are the same as the Class 220s, but the bogies are very different: the Class 220 Voyager B5000 bogies have inside-frames which expose the whole of the wheel faces, while the Class 221 SuperVoyager Y36 bogies have a more traditional outside-framed bogie. Unlike the Class 220s, the Class 221s were built with a hydraulic-actuated tilting system to run at high speed around bends, though this has now been disabled from the 24 sets operated by CrossCountry.

Each coach weighs between 55 and 57tonnes, with a total train weight of 281.9tonnes for a five-car set (227 tonnesfor a four-car set).

Class 221 units are fitted with automatic sanding systems. The Avanti West Coast operated units are fitted with a Vossloh fixed rate sander and the Arriva Cross Country operated units are fitted with AB Hoses and fittings variable rate sanding system.

All Class 221 units are maintained at the dedicated Central Rivers TMD near Burton-on-Trent.

Formation and passenger facilities 

As part of a franchise commitment to replace all of the Mark 2 and High Speed Train sets, Virgin CrossCountry ordered 40 five-carriage sets. In addition four four-carriage sets were ordered to replace High Speed Trains on Virgin Trains' North Wales Coast Line services to Holyhead. However all entered service with Virgin CrossCountry.

In November 2010, Virgin Trains reformed its three four-car sets into two five-car sets and a residual spare two-car set by inserting the two intermediate (non-driving) cars from 221144 into 221142 and 221143, giving 20 five-car sets (and two spare driving cars). This was aimed at providing more flexibility and consistency in operating Birmingham-Scotland and London-North Wales services. In 2017, a further reformation took place, allowing 221144 to be returned to traffic with CrossCountry, now operated by Arriva, involving the exchange of some vehicles between Virgin and CrossCountry and the reduction of two CrossCountry sets to four car formations.

All vehicles are air-conditioned and fitted with Wifi provided by T-Mobile. On some units, the at-seat audio entertainment system is still present however it has now been disabled since the WiFi hot spots were introduced. Power sockets are also available for laptop computers and mobile-phone charging. First-class accommodation has 2+1 seating, standard class 2+2 seating. Virgin Trains' units are fitted with CCTV. These trains, unlike the older trains they replaced, have electronic information display boards in the exterior walls showing the train number, the time, the coach, the train's destination and the next station.

The trains have been criticised for providing insufficient space for luggage and bicycles. Also, because the units are designed to tilt, the carriages have a tapered profile that narrows towards roof level, resulting in a less spacious interior than the conventional carriages they replaced.

The formation and capacity of each unit depends on the operator.

Operations 

All units are owned by Beacon Rail, after they were purchased from Voyager Rail Leasing, a consortium of Lloyds Banking Group and Angel Trains. They are leased to the train operating companies.

On their introduction in 2002, Virgin Trains was the operator of all Class 221s, which it used on CrossCountry and West Coast Main Line services as well as on the North Wales Coast line.

With the decision to transfer those CrossCountry services that operated via the West Coast Main Line to the InterCity West Coast franchise at the same time as the former franchise was relet, on 11 November 2007 the fleet was split. Virgin West Coast were allocated 221101-221118 and 221142-221144 while CrossCountry gained 221119-221141. However while CrossCountry overhauled five High Speed Train sets, 221114-221118 were subleased for a 12-month period.

CrossCountry
CrossCountry's Class 221s operate alongside 220s on the routes inherited from Virgin CrossCountry. Since these routes are not cleared for tilting operation (with the exception of Wolverhampton to Stockport), in 2008 the tilting equipment was locked out of use and shortly afterwards was isolated altogether, replacing the hydraulic rams with fixed tie-bars. This change was made to improve reliability and reduce maintenance costs.

Avanti West Coast 

Avanti West Coast uses the Class 221 units primarily between London Euston and Scotland via Birmingham New Street (despite the route being electrified throughout), between London Euston and Shrewsbury, and between London Euston and Chester and North Wales. They are also used by a few London Euston to West Midlands services.

The trains to and from Scotland often operate as double units and alternate between Glasgow Central and Edinburgh Waverley (in turn alternating with TransPennine Express trains to and from Manchester Airport). When longer trains are needed for some of the busier services, a Pendolino will run through from and to London Euston, and the Super Voyager then fills in for it on the London to West Midlands route.

The trains on the North Wales route sometimes operate as double units. They run from London Euston and terminate at any of Chester, Holyhead, Bangor or Wrexham. The daily return service from London Euston to Shrewsbury also operates using the Class 221.

Technical problems and incidents 
Units have been stopped due to waves breaking over the sea wall at Dawlish in storm conditions, inundating the resistor banks and causing the control software to shut down the whole train. This problem was fixed by a software upgrade to the control software.

On 8 December 2005, unit 221125 suffered an exhaust fire at Starcross. Other members of the Voyager class suffered similar fires in the 2005-2006 period due to an incorrectly performed engine overhaul.

On 25 September 2006, unit 221136 collided with a car on the track at Moor Lane, Copmanthorpe, North Yorkshire. The 14:25 Plymouth to Edinburgh was decelerating on its approach to York station at 9pm when it collided with the car, which had crashed through a fence on to the line. Despite being derailed in the  crash, the train remained upright. Nobody on board was injured.

On 4 July 2009, unit 221112 was involved in a collision between with a set of freight train container doors, Eden Valley Loop, . At 16:27, Virgin Trains (1M86) service from Edinburgh to Birmingham New Street passed service 4M16, a container freight train which was in the Eden Valley Loop. The train struck one or both open doors of wagons 12 and or 13 of the container train. The crew of the service heard the impacts and stopped to report the damage to their control at 16:28. The train suffered damage to all cars consisting of scratching to bodywork,
in particular doors, as well as severe damage to one door step. The Super Voyager was one of three trains to be damaged by the container doors; a Class 390 and a Class 185 were also involved.

On 20 November 2013 a Virgin Super Voyager (unit 221105) overran the platform and ran into the buffers at Chester. One passenger was taken to hospital.  The RAIB report concluded that this was due to exceptionally low adhesion between wheels and rails, combined with train's sanding system being inadequate. The report recommended that the sanding equipment on the class be upgraded.

Future 
In December 2019, Avanti West Coast placed an order for 10 seven-car electric units which will replace its Class 221 fleet,  along with 13 Class 805 bi-mode units as part of £350million contract with Hitachi. These are planned to enter service in 2023.

Fleet details 

In June 2014, one vehicle in CrossCountry unit 220007 was damaged after it caught fire at Eastleigh Works. As a temporary fix, the damaged vehicle from 220007 was replaced with one taken from 221135. The two units were returned to their original formations in February 2015.
In June 2022, units 221142 and 221143 were the first 221s to be returned to their owners after their leases to Avanti West Coast ended. The class are set to be replaced by new  and 807 units from 2023 onwards.

See also 
 List of high speed trains
 Class 222 Meridian

References

Further reading

External links 

 Testing the Class 221s
 Railway Herald Issue 150 page 6 contains an image of a reconfigured Super Voyager.

221
Tilting trains
Bombardier Transportation multiple units
Virgin Trains
Passenger trains running at least at 200 km/h in commercial operations
High-speed trains of the United Kingdom
Train-related introductions in 2002